Åsmund Grøver Aukrust (born 28 February 1985) is a Norwegian politician for the Labour Party. He is member of Parliament from Akershus county, first elected at the Norwegian parliament election in 2013. He was the deputy leader of the Workers' Youth League (AUF) from 2010 to 2014. He was also deputy member of the Parliament of Norway for the term 2009–2013.

Early life and education
Aukrust was born in Bærum. He studied at the University of Oslo receiving a bachelor's degree in sociology. He currently resides in Oslo.

Political career
First elected to the Akershus county council in 2005, he was elected as a deputy member of the Parliament of Norway in 2009. He has also been active in campaigning against Norwegian membership in the European Union through the organization No to the EU. At the official unveiling ceremony of the new cabinet after the 2009 elections, Aukrust caused a stir when he suddenly appeared among the ministers. Aukrust explained that he was merely trying to hand out flowers to the cabinet member who was opposed to EU membership.

He served as deputy leader of the Workers' Youth League from 2010 to 2014. He originally ran for the leadership, but narrowly lost the vote to Eskil Pedersen in a closely contested race, although the election committee overwhelmingly favored him. On 25 April 2011, he was elected vice president of the International Union of Socialist Youth. He was appointed as political advisor to the Minister of Culture Anniken Huitfeldt in November 2011.

Ahead of the 2013 election the Labour Party announced that Aukrust was nominated for the 4th seat in Akershus county. Analysts considered the seat to be safe for the Labour Party. He was subsequently elected to the seat.

On 23 March 2022, he and Lene Vågslid were appointed new deputy parliamentary leaders in the aftermath of Terje Aasland’s appointment to the government.

References

External links
 Åsmund Aukrust's official blog

1985 births
Living people
University of Oslo alumni
Labour Party (Norway) politicians
Bærum politicians
Deputy members of the Storting
21st-century Norwegian politicians
Survivors of the 2011 Norway attacks